The Agulhas Bank (from Portuguese for Cape Agulhas, Cabo das Agulhas, "Cape of Needles") is  a broad, shallow part of the southern African continental shelf which extends up to  south of Cape Agulhas before falling steeply to the abyssal plain.

It is the ocean region where the warm Indian Ocean and the cold Atlantic Ocean meet.  This convergence leads to treacherous sailing conditions, accounting for numerous wrecked ships in the area over the years.  However, the meeting of the oceans here also fuels the nutrient cycle for marine life, making it one of the best fishing grounds in South Africa.

Extent and characteristics

It is entirely within the exclusive economic zone of South Africa. 

The National Spatial Biodiversity Assessment 2004 recognised 34 biozones nested within 9 bioregions (of which four were offshore).  The National Biodiversity Assessment 2011 replaced these ecozones and biozones with the terms ecoregions and ecozones.  In 2011, the Agulhas Ecoregion was divided into four distinct ecozones: Agulhas inshore,  Agulhas inner shelf, Agulhas outer shelf, and Agulhas shelf edge.  33 different benthic habitats types were identified on the Agulhas Bank.

Many rocky sub-tidal reefs are of aeolianite or sandstone origin, but granite, quartzite and siltstone reefs are also present. The Agulhas reefs are very heterogeneous and include several possible different sub-types. Some of the reefs are within protected areas, but only a few of those protected areas include protection from fishing.

Oceanography
The Agulhas Bank is a natural boundary between ocean currents from the Atlantic Ocean, Indian Ocean, and Southern Ocean, resulting in one of the most turbulent waters of the world oceans.

Agulhas Current

The Agulhas Current flows south along the African east-coast and along the south-eastern edge of the bank.  It then retroflects back into the Indian Ocean south-west of the bank.  This retroflection results in intense eddy activities such as meanders, eddies, and filaments.
In upper layer water, the Agulhas rings and eddies move warm and salty water into the large South Atlantic gyre, which exports it to the tropics.  In the lower ocean layers water is transported in the opposite direction.

Upwellings
Cyclonic eddies is another source of edge upwelling west of Port Elisabeth.  Plumes of warm surface water migrate onto the bank along its eastern edge, providing subtropical surface water from the Indian Ocean.
In summer, easterly winds can intermittently drive coastal upwelling along the South African south coast.
The Agulhas Bank is dominated by westerly winds and most of the upwelling on the bank is related to the interaction of the Agulhas Current on the eastern edge, but easterly winds do occur, especially in summer and fall, and can generate local upwelling cells.

As the current is diverged away from the coast, dynamic processes draws an onshore Ekman layer of cold water from below the warm shelf-edge flow.

In summer, there is mixture of subtropical water separated by thermoclines from cool waters, but there is a considerable seasonal variation.  On the shelf, bottom waters exhibit characteristics of the central Indian Ocean in the east and central Atlantic Ocean waters in the west.

Agulhas meanders and Natal pulses
As the Agulhas Current flows south along the African east coast, it tends to bulge inshore frequently, a deviation from the current's normal path known as Agulhas Current meanders (ACM). These bulges are occasionally (1-7 times per year) followed by a much larger offshore bulge, known as Natal pulses (NP). An ACM induces a strong inshore counter-current.

Large-scale cyclonic meanders known as Natal pulses are formed as the Agulhas Current reaches the continental shelf on the South African east-coast (i.e. the eastern Agulhas Bank off Natal). As these pulses move along the coast on the Agulhas Bank, they tend to pinch off Agulhas rings from the Agulhas Current. Such a ring shedding can be triggered by a Natal pulse alone, but sometimes meanders on the Agulhas Return Current merge to contribute to the shedding of an Agulhas ring.

Agulhas leakage and rings

Agulhas rings are large anticyclonic eddies or warm core rings of ocean water that are pinched off the Agulhas Current along the eastern edge of the Agulhas Bank from where they move into the South Atlantic.  As the Agulhas Current reaches the east coast of South Africa, large solitary meanders known as Natal pulses form at irregular intervals.  165 days after the appearance of a Natal pulse, an Agulhas ring is formed off Durban.  The Agulhas rings are among the largest eddies in the world and play an important role in the Agulhas Leakage, the transport of warm water from the Indian Ocean to the Atlantic Ocean, which affects the global climate.

Only half of the Agulhas eddies that leave  the Cape Basin manage to cross the Walvis Ridge and those that do tend to lose half their energy before reaching the ridge within six months. The Agulhas rings transport an estimated 1-5 Sv (millions m²/s) of water from the Indian Ocean to the South Atlantic.

The Agulhas rings are thought to be of global climatic importance.  Their delivery of warm water from the Indian to the Atlantic Ocean can control the rate of thermohaline overturning of the entire Atlantic.  Other factors contribute, to various degrees, to the inter-ocean exchanges in the region, including filaments from the Agulhas Current and intrusions of water from Antarctica.  Cold, cyclonic eddies have been observed in the southwestern Atlantic.
Based on model simulations, researchers have found that the interaction of the Agulhas Current and the eastern edge of the bank can result in the Agulhas rings.

The provenance of ocean sediments can be determined by analysing terrigenous strontium isotope ratios in deep ocean cores.  Sediments underlying the Agulhas Current and Return Current have significantly higher ratios than surrounding sediments.  Analyses of cores in the South Atlantic deposited during the Last Glacial Maximum (LGM, 20 000 years ago), show that the Agulhas leakage (shedding of Agulhas rings) was significantly reduced.  It has been hypothesised that the reason for this was that the Agulhas Current was stronger which resulted in a more eastward retroflection and therefore less leakage.  However, analyses of such cores south of Africa show that the trajectory of the current was the same during the LGM and that the reduced leakage must be explained by a weaker current.  Consequently, it can be predicted that a stronger Agulhas Current will result in its retroflection occurring more eastward and an increased Agulhas leakage.

Benguela Current

Compared to the Agulhas Current, the Benguela Current on the west and south-west coast of Africa is more intense and steadier.  Its dynamic southern upwelling system is driven by the prevailing northward winds that produce an intense off-shore Ekman transport.  Most of this upwelling is concentrated to a few upwelling cells in the southern region: Namaqua (30°S), Cape Columbine (32.5°S), and Cape Peninsula (34°S).  The wind is most intense from October to February, and the contrast in sea surface temperature between the open sea and the shelf is most prominent during summer.

Coastal upwelling is also common on the western bank, but the more stable atmospheric condition results in larger cold water plumes that sometimes merge to form a continuous upwelling regime along the South African south-west coast.  This upwelling zone is the southernmost extension of the Benguela Current Large Maritime Ecosystem.  The Agulhas Current regularly flows around the southern tip of the bank and brings warm water to the western bank along the bank's western edge.
Regularly, the mesoscale eddies from the east interact with the Benguela upwelling system on the African west coast.

Deep water eddies
Flowing south along the South American continental slope, the Deep Western Boundary Current (DWBC) carries North Atlantic Deep Water (NADW) into the South Atlantic. One such NADW eddy was observed in 2003 and the researchers speculated that a deeply penetrating Agulhas ring pinched it off the NADW slope current. Most of the NADW flow (more than 7 Sv) meanders east around the Agulhas Plateau together with the surface Agulhas Return Current, but a smaller portion (3 Sv) continues north along the African east-coast as the Agulhas Undercurrent.
Of 89.5 Sv released from the North Atlantic, 3.6 Sv leaves the South Atlantic south of the Agulhas Bank.  However, 0.9 Sv recirculate in the basin north of the Walvis Ridge for centuries, of which 50-90% end up flowing south of the Agulhas Bank within 300 years, increasing the net inter-oceanic exchange with 4.1-4.5 Sv.

Alphard Banks 

The Alphard Banks are a small group of long extinct volcanic seamounts on the Agulhas Bank south of Cape Agulhas. They rise from the bottom at about 80 m to about 14 m on the top.

Geology

The proto-South Atlantic closed during the Saldanian orogeny to form part of the supercontinent Gondwana (700-600 Mya). The Cape granites were emplaced and the Kaaimans Group rocks were folded and thermally metamorphosed during this period. The formation of the main basin in the Cape Province commenced 570 Mya and lasted for 200 My. Synclines along the coast of the southern Cape contains sediments from the Bokkveld Group.

The Cape Fold Belt (CFB) rocks and the Karoo Basin were deposited 450 Mya; the Cape Supergroup 450-300 Mya during a series of transgression-regression cycles.
Pan-African thrusts were reactivated 270-215 Mya to form the CFB which was then part of  a continuous fold belt that developed during the Gondwanide orogeny together with Sierra de la Ventana (Argentina), Pensacola Mountains (East Antarctica), and Ellsworth Mountains (West Antarctica).  In the late Carboniferous and early Jurassic, the Karoo Supergroup was deposited in the Karoo Basin north of where the CFB is located today, and covering nearly two-thirds of present-day South Africa.

Gondwana breakup
Basaltic lavas were extruded 183 Mya to form the Karoo large igneous province; a volcanism caused by the Bouvet hotspot which is linked to the Gondwana break-up. The Bouvet hotspot was located in or near present-day South Africa from the late Triassic 220 mya and until the Africa-Antarctica breakup 120 mya.  The Bouvet hotspot track stretches south-east from the African continent, near the South Africa-Mozambique border, and east of the AFFZ down to  Bouvet Island/Bouvet Triple Junction in the South Atlantic. 100 Mya, the region where the triple junction was located passed over the hotspot, resulting in a continuous eruption that lasted to about 94 Mya and the seafloor spreading that still separates Antarctica, Africa, and South America.

It is one of the largest and most spectacular fracture zones on Earth. It developed during the Early Cretaceous as West Gondwana (South America) broke up from Africa. The AFFZ is characterized by a pronounced topographic anomaly, the Agulhas Ridge (41°S,16°E-43°S,9°E) which rises more than 2 km above the surrounding sea floor. The only equivalent in size are the neighbouring Diaz Ridge and the Falkland Escarpment. The Agulhas Ridge is unique because it was not formed during the continental breakup during the Cretaceous and because it separates oceanic crusts of different age, and not oceanic crust (~14 km thick) from continental crust (25 km thick).

North of the AFFZ is the Outeniqua Basin which is a complex system of sub-basins separated from each other by faults and basement arches; there are several smaller fault-bounded sub-basins in the north (Bredasdorp, Infanta, Pletmos, Gamtoos, and Algoa) and a distinctively deeper sub-basin in the south, the South Outeniqua Basin. The sedimentary fill of these basins developed as the northern edge of the Falkland Plateau separated from the South African southern margin during the early Cretaceous.

The Diaz Marginal Ridge (DMR) separates these basins from the AFFZ. The DMR must therefore have formed after the initial West Gondwana breakup 130-90 Mya. The DMR probably formed when new, hot oceanic crust slid past old, cold continental crust and the contrast in temperatures induced a thermal uplift.

As West Gondwana drifted away from Africa roughly 125 Myr, the South Atlantic seafloor formed between them and magnetic anomalies north of the AFFZ reflects phase of the seafloor spreading. South of the AFFZ traces can be found of how the Falkland Plateau and the Agulhas Bank moved relative to each other.  On a modern map, the Falkland Plateau can still be rotated and fitted into the Natal Valley in the Indian Ocean east of South Africa. The Agulhas Plateau is located southeast of the shelf, separated from it by the Agulhas Passage (through which the Agulhas Current flows.)

Pliocene
The Alphard Tertiary Igneous Province includes Palaeocene tuffs, trachybasalts, aegirine–augite trachytes and aegirine–augite phonolitic trachytes, which have been radiometrically dated at about 58 million years old. The intrusions appear to be tectonic effects.

One of the largest known slumps occurred on the south-eastern edge of the Agulhas Bank in the Pliocene or more recently. It is a composite slump with proximal and distal allochthonous sediment masses separated by a large glide plane scar. In the western part, the sediments are dammed by basement ridges, but, in the eastern part, they have spread into the Transkei Basin. A series of slump scarps along the western edge of the shelf are 18–2 Mya, but covered by younger sediments brought there by the Benguela upwelling.

Human evolution

Anatomically modern humans evolved around 200 kya.  The genetic diversity in the human lineage is relatively low, which indicate one or several population bottlenecks late in our lineage.  It has been estimated that the population was limited to perhaps 600 individuals during the MIS 6 glacial stage (195-125 kya), one of the longest cold periods in the Quaternary of Africa.  A technological and behavioural revolution that occurred globally about 50 kya led to a cultural complexity which happened in South Africa around 120-70 kya.

The Cape Floral Region is a thin coastal strip and a botanic hotspot which developed at the confluence of the Benguela Upwelling and Agulhas Current. According to what professor Curtis Marean calls the "Cape Floral Region – South Coast Model" for the origins of modern humans, the early hunter-gatherers survived on shellfish, as well as geophytes, fur seal, fish, seabirds, and wash-ups found on the exposed Agulhas Bank.

The present South African southern coastal plain (SCP) is still separated from the rest of Africa by the Cape Fold Belt.  During glacial maxima the sea-level dropped .  This not only left large parts of the Agulhas Bank exposed, which greatly expanded the area of the SCP, but it also reconnected the SCP to the rest of Africa by the shallow water shelves, which broke the isolation of the SCP.  Modern humans evolved on the SCP and the fluctuation in sea-levels would have resulted in a significant variation in selective pressure.  No fossil records are known from the now submerged shelf, but a series of key fossil sites along the coastal margin of the present SCP provide earliest traces of anatomically modern humans and the use of marine resources.

Commercial importance
South Africa began oil exploration on the Agulhas Bank in the 1980s.  Of more than 200 offshore wells in South Africa, most are found on Bredasdorp Basin on the Agulhas Bank.

Fishery
The Agulhas Bank is also significant for fisheries who use demersal trawling, demersal longline fishing, and midwater trawl fishing on the bank.  Squid and small pelagic fishes are also caught.  Before the introduction of the EEZ, foreign fisheries used roch-hopper gear trawling on the bank.

Most of the catches are short-lived shelf-zone pelagic species and more long-lived deep-water species.  The large populations of sardine and anchovy also present on the shelf follow an annual cycle.  Anchovy spawn on the western Agulhas Bank in early summer while the sardines span over a broader season and area — eggs are transported by currents to the nursery area in the St Helena Bay on the South African west coast from where juvenile then migrate back to the Agulhas Bank to spawn.

South Africa has a relatively large fishing industry mostly catching pelagic pilchard and anchovy and demersal hake on the south and western coasts.  Though the east coast has fewer commercial fisheries, the large human population along there has resulted in overexploitation of coastal fish and invertebrate stocks by recreational and subsistence fishers.  A small aquaculture industry produces mussels and oysters offshore.

Several pelagic species are heavily harvested by the commercial fleet: purse-seine fishery is used to catch sardines, anchovies, and round herring; mid-water trawl fishery to catch horse mackerel and chub mackerel; pelagic longline and pole fishery to catch tunas and swordfish; while hook and line are used inshore to catch squid and teleost species, including snoek and geelbek.  All these species are relatively common and are considered having an important role in the ecosystem.

Biodiversity

There are at least 12,914 marine species in South Africa, but small bodied species are poorly documented and the abyssal zone is almost completely unexplored.  Almost a quarter of South Africa's coast line is protected, excluding deeper water.  A third of the marine species are endemic to South Africa (though poor levels of taxonomic research in adjoining countries probably affects the apparent endemism.)  The degree of endemism varies considerably among taxa: Bryozoa 64%, Mollusca 56%, Echinodermata 3.6%, Porifera 8.8%, Amphipoda 33%, Isopoda 85%, or Cumacea 71%.
Fisheries are one of the major threats to the biodiversity of the Agulhas Bank.

Crustaceans
Copepods comprise 90% of the zooplankton carbon on the Agulhas Bank, and are thus an important source of food for pelagic fish and juvenile squids.  The population of Calanus agulhensis, a large species that dominates the copepod community in terms of biomass, has a center of distribution on the central Agulhas Bank.  Since 1997 the copepod biomass on the central Agulhas Bank has declined significantly while the biomass of pelagic fish has increased significantly.  While it is likely that predation has played an important role in the copepod decline, global warming (sea surface temperature and chlorophyll A abundance) is believed to have contributed to a smaller population.

Fishes

The shelf edge along the bank's southern tip is subject to sporadic upwelling. This slope and its surrounding seamounts are the spawning ground for sardine, anchovy, and horse mackerel. Eddies help transport water inshore and link the spawning habitat with important nursery areas.
Eggs and larvae laid by the anchovy are transported via the Good Hope Jet to Africa's southwestern coast where they mature.  Young anchovies then return to the Agulhas Bank to spawn.
Young sardine and anchovy congregate along the west coast between March and September before they migrate to their spawning grounds on the Agulhas Bank. Sardines of intermediate age are present on the western Agulhas Bank between January and April before migrating to KwaZulu-Natal for winter.

The bank is the spawning area of deep reef fish species, including the threatened endemic red steenbras (Petrus rupestris).  Other species have been overexploited, including daggerhead seabream or dageraad (Chrysoblephus cristiceps), black musselcracker (Cymatoceps nasutus), and silver kob (Argyrosomus inodorus).

57 species of sharks have been reported off the western coast of South Africa, of which 21 are squaloid sharks.

Birds

The main food source for African penguins (Spheniscus demersus) is anchovy and sardine which they forage between Cape Columbine and the central Agulhas Bank.  The birds have colonies on Dassen Island, on the South African west coast, and Bird Island, on the south coast.
African penguins breed opportunistically, following the anchovy and sardine: from February to September on the Western Cape but from January to July on St Croix Island off Eastern Cape.

In 2005, when Korean and Philippine vessels started longline fishing along the edges of the Agulhas Bank, seabird bycatch became a huge problem.  Large numbers of albatrosses and petrels were killed — in average 0.6 birds per 1000 hooks, but up to 18 birds per 1000 hooks were reported.  Since 2007, however, more restrictive permit conditions for foreign-flagged fleets and the use of birds scaring lines have decreased the number of killed birds by 85%.

Fur seals

Cape fur seals are present along the South African coast.  Fur seals are protected in South Africa since 1893 although a small number are occasionally culled to protect sea birds.  Many seals are caught in fishery nets and boat propellers, but the seals are also regularly accused of stealing fish from the fisheries.  Sharks are known to prey on them, but in 2012 a cape fur seal was observed preying on and consuming a mid-sized blue shark.

Cetaceans

51 species, or more than 50%, of the recognized species of cetaceans are present in the southern African subregion (between the equator and the Antarctic ice edge), of which 36 have been sighted in South African and Namibian waters.

A vulnerable population of fish-eating killer whales are present offshore on the Agulhas Bank.  Observations peak in January while few are sighted in April and May.  The killer whales move in pods of 1-4 individuals and are mostly sited over the shelf edge off the south-east coast.
An analysis of killer whale mtDNA has shown that there was a peak inter-oceanic migration events during the Eemian interglacial period, 131-114 kya.  This peak coincides with a period of maximal Agulhas leakage which promoted a rapid and episodic interchange of killer whale lineages.  During this period killer whales and other marine top predators, such as the great white shark, colonised the North Atlantic and Mediterranean by following their prey — bluefin tuna and swordfish.

A vagrant Commerson's dolphin — a species with two isolated populations, one along the southern coast of Argentina and the other around the Kerguelen Islands — was sighted on the Agulhas Bank in 2004. It is not known from which population the sighted individual stems.

Fossil beaked whales have been recovered by trawling from the seafloor off South Africa.  Stranded pygmy sperm whales have been recorded on both the east and west coasts of South Africa.

Conservation 
There are several marine protected areas on the Agulhas Bank. These include:

Coastal MPAs:
  (Nelson Mandela Bay, Port Elizabeth, Eastern Cape, 2019)
  (Western Cape, 2000)
  (Eastern Cape, 2004)
  (South of Cape Town, Western Cape, 2019)(
  (Western Cape, 2000)
  (Western Cape, 2000)
  (Western Cape, 2000)
  (Eastern Cape, 2000)
  (Western Cape, 2000)
  (Eastern Cape, 2000)
  (Western Cape, 2004, partly in the area which may be considered part of the Agulhas Bank)
  (Eastern Cape, 2000)
  (Western Cape, 2001, seasonal)
Offshore MPAs:
  (South of Cape Agulhas, Western Cape, 2019)
  (South of Port Elizabeth, Eastern Cape, 2019)
  (South of Cape Agulhas, Western Cape. 2019)
  (Offshore of Port Elizabeth, Eastern Cape, 2019)

References

Notes

Sources

 
 
 
 
 
 
 
 
 
 
 
 
 
 
 
 
 
 
 
 
 
 
 
 
 
 
 
 
 
 
 
 
 
 
 
 
 
 

Fishing areas of the Atlantic Ocean
Fishing areas of the Indian Ocean
Fishing in South Africa
Geography of South Africa
Temperate Southern Africa
Undersea banks of the Atlantic Ocean
Undersea banks of the Indian Ocean